Spandan "Spoon" Daftary (born April 13, 1981 in New Castle, Pennsylvania) is a 2-time Emmy Award–winning associate producer, whose most recent work includes ESPN2's Quite Frankly with Stephen A. Smith, which was cancelled by the network in January 2007.

Professional career
Spandan worked on ESPN's Sportscenter in 2003 and 2004 when the show won consecutive Sports Emmy awards for "Outstanding Daily Studio Show."

High-school athletics
Spandan started at forward for Sewickley Academy's 1999 Section Championship squad. The head coach of the team, Victor Gianatta, gave Spandan the nickname, "Spoon".

References

American television producers
Living people
1981 births
American Jains
Sewickley Academy alumni